Waterville Valley is a ski resort in Waterville Valley, New Hampshire, United States. It is located within the White Mountain National Forest. The ski area has 11 lifts, including two high-speed quads and the slopes primarily face east and northeast.

In addition to downhill skiing, the resort offers  of Nordic skiing, golf, nationally-ranked tennis courts, a skateboard park, a year-round ice arena, hiking, biking, and water sports.

History
Organized skiing first started on Mount Tecumseh in the 1930s with the construction of two Civilian Conservation Corps ski trails.  The first of the two trails was abandoned after a decade, while the latter would later become incorporated into the Waterville Valley ski area.

A group led by Tom Corcoran opened Waterville Valley  in 1966 with four new Stadeli double chairlifts and a J-Bar surface lift. Of the original chairlifts, only the Lower Meadows remains.

Over the next few decades, three Stadeli triple chairlifts were installed, including the World Cup Triple in 1985.

In 1988, a Poma high-speed detachable quad chairlift was installed, running parallel to the World Cup Triple and High Country Double chairlifts.  Due to wind issues, the upper portion of this lift was later removed.  As a result, the top portion of the ski area is only served by the High Country Double chairlift. In 1997, a Doppelmayr high speed detachable quad chairlift was installed, known as "Quadzilla".

Ownership
After filing for bankruptcy protection in the summer of 1994, Waterville Valley was briefly owned by the American Skiing Company in the mid-1990s.  Due to anti-trust issues, Waterville and Cranmore Mountain Resort were sold to California-based Booth Creek Ski Holdings in the fall of 1996. Members of the Sununu family of New Hampshire and a group of area investors purchased the resort in October 2010 and it remains independent.

World Cup
Waterville Valley first hosted World Cup alpine events in slalom and giant slalom in 1969 and was a regular stop on the tour for most of the 1980s.
The 1969 races saw American women take four of the six podium positions, as Kiki Cutter won the slalom for her fourth World Cup win and Judy Nagel took third. Two days earlier, Marilyn Cochran and Karen Budge tied for second in the giant slalom. After two podiums at Waterville Valley in 1982, Tamara McKinney won five consecutive World Cup events at the resort from 1983 to 1985. The most recent WC races were held , with six events in March to conclude the 1991 season.

The circuit did not return to the eastern U.S. for over a quarter century, until November 2016 at Killington, Vermont, with women's technical events (giant slalom, slalom) on Thanksgiving weekend.

Clubs and schools
Waterville Valley hosts the "Black and Blue Trail Smashers" (also known as BBTS) ski club, one of the oldest in the USA, founded in 1934. The team has expanded its training to include ski racing, freestyle skiing and snowboarding, and boardercross disciplines. WVBBTS has received many prestigious awards since its inception, including the USSA Club of the Year award in 2006. It is the "home club" of Olympic gold medalist Hannah Kearney, winner of the women's moguls in 2010.

Waterville Valley Academy (WVA), a seasonal winter sports boarding school that specializes in training skiers and snowboarders, conducts training at Waterville. WVA is a subsidiary of the Waterville Valley BBTS ski club, using many of the club's resources and staff in its operations.

References

External links
 
 New England Ski History – Waterville Valley
 Mt. Tecumseh—New England's Alpine CCC Ski Trails
International Ski Federation (FIS) – World Cup events – Waterville Valley

Buildings and structures in Grafton County, New Hampshire
Civilian Conservation Corps in New Hampshire
Resorts in the United States
Ski areas and resorts in New Hampshire
Tourist attractions in Grafton County, New Hampshire
Waterville Valley, New Hampshire